Linois was the lead ship of her class of protected cruisers built for the French Navy in the 1890s. The class was ordered as part of a construction program directed at strengthening the fleet's cruiser force. At the time, France was concerned with the growing naval threat of the Italian and German fleets, and the new cruisers were intended to serve with the main fleet, and overseas in the French colonial empire.

Linois was completed in 1895 and joined the Mediterranean Squadron the next year, serving as part of the cruiser force of the main French battle fleet. She took part in training exercises during this period, which sometimes included joint maneuvers with the Northern Squadron. The ship was involved in a show of force meant to intimidate the Ottoman Empire in 1902 during a period of tension with France. Linois remained in service with the squadron through 1905 and was struck from the naval register in 1910, thereafter being broken up for scrap.

Design

In response to a war scare with Italy in the late 1880s, the French Navy embarked on a major construction program in 1890 to counter the threat of the Italian fleet and that of Italy's ally Germany. The plan called for a total of seventy cruisers for use in home waters and overseas in the French colonial empire. The Linois class was ordered as part of the program, and the design was based on the earlier .

She displaced . Her crew varied over the course of her career, amounting to 250–269 officers and enlisted men. The ship's propulsion system consisted of a pair of triple-expansion steam engines driving two screw propellers. Steam was provided by six coal-burning fire-tube boilers that were ducted into two funnels.

The ship was armed with a main battery of four  45-caliber guns in individual pivot mounts, all in sponsons located amidships with two guns per broadside. These were supported by a secondary battery that consisted of a pair of  guns, one at the bow and the other at the stern. For close-range defense against torpedo boats, she carried eight  3-pounder Hotchkiss guns, two  guns, and four 37 mm Hotchkiss revolver cannon. She was also armed with four  torpedo tubes in her hull above the waterline, and she had provisions to carry up to 120 naval mines.

Service history

Linois was built at the  shipyard in La Seyne-sur-Mer. She was laid down in August 1892, the first member of her class to begin construction. She was launched on 30 January 1894 and was completed in 1895. The ship conducted her sea trials later that year, including tests in July and August. Linois was assigned to the Mediterranean Squadron in 1896, serving in the cruiser force for the main French fleet, along with three armored cruisers, three protected cruisers, and four torpedo cruisers. The maneuvers for that year took place from 6 to 30 July. She remained with the unit through 1897. By 1899, the unit had been strengthened with new ships, allowing older, less effective vessels to be sent elsewhere. By that time, the unit consisted of six pre-dreadnought battleships, three armored cruisers, seven other protected cruisers, and several smaller vessels in addition to Linois. The unit remained largely unchanged in 1900, apart from the reduction in the number of protected cruisers to five, including Linois.

She operated with the Mediterranean Squadron in 1901. That year, the annual fleet maneuvers were conducted from 3 to 28 July. During the exercises, the Northern Squadron steamed south for joint maneuvers with the Mediterranean Squadron. The Northern Squadron ships formed part of the hostile force, and as it was entering the Mediterranean from the Atlantic, represented a German squadron attempting to meet its Italian allies. On 30 October, Linois joined elements of the Mediterranean Squadron to conduct what were purported to be tests with wireless telegraphy, but was in fact a show of force in the Aegean Sea to intimidate the Ottoman Empire. Relations between the two were poor at the time. On 6 November, two of the battleships and several cruisers, including Linois, were detached to sail east for the operation. The cruisers proceeded independently from the battleships and met them at Mytilene on the island of Lesbos. The ships then re-formed and arrived back in Toulon on 9 December.

The ship continued to serve in the squadron through 1902. During the 1902 fleet maneuvers, which began on 7 July, the Northern Squadron attempted to force a passage through the Strait of Gibraltar. The cruisers of the Mediterranean Squadron, including Linois, conducted patrols from their base at Mers El Kébir to observe their entrance and signal the rest of the fleet. After successfully detecting the simulated enemy squadron, they shadowed the vessels until the rest of the Mediterranean Squadron assembled, but the Northern Squadron commander was able to shake his pursuers long enough to prevent them from intercepting his force before the end of the exercises on 15 July. Further maneuvers with the combined fleet took place, concluding on 5 August. The ship remained in service with the squadron through 1905. In March 1905, in late March, she the cruiser  were present in Tangier during a visit by the German armored cruiser  and the passenger steamer , which had the German Kaiser Wilhelm II aboard. The visit precipitated the First Moroccan Crisis between France and Germany. She was struck from the naval register in 1910 and was sold to ship breakers for disposal.

Notes

References
 
 
 
 
 
 
 
 
 
 
 
 
 
 
 
 
 
 
 
 
 

Linois-class cruisers
Ships built in France
1894 ships